is an action-adventure game for the PlayStation Portable handheld that features a sandbox style of play. The game was developed by Irem Software Engineering in Japan and is published by Atlus in North America.

It is a spinoff of Steambot Chronicles, a 2005 PlayStation 2 title. A sequel to Steambot Chronicles, called Bumpy Trot 2, was announced and shown at the 2006 Tokyo Game Show, though it was officially cancelled in 2011. Blocks Club with Bumpy Trot is another spinoff title, originally released for the PlayStation 2 and later ported to the PlayStation Portable.

Reception 

Battle Tournament received "mixed" reviews according to video game review aggregator Metacritic.  In Japan, Famitsu gave it a score of all four sevens, for a total of 28 out of 40.

References

External links 
Official website 

2008 video games
Action-adventure games
Atlus games
Irem games
PlayStation Portable games
PlayStation Portable-only games
Video games developed in Japan
Video games featuring protagonists of selectable gender
Video games with cel-shaded animation
Multiplayer and single-player video games